The Women's giant slalom competition at the FIS Alpine World Ski Championships 2019 was held on 14 February. A qualification was scheduled to take place on 11 February, but was cancelled.

Petra Vlhová won the gold, the first-ever for Slovakia at the World Championships. First run leader Viktoria Rebensburg took the silver, and reigning Olympic champion Mikaela Shiffrin settled for bronze; defending champion Tessa Worley was sixth.

Results
Run 1 was started at 14:15, and run 2 at 18:00. Rain preceded the first run, with unseasonable temperatures well above freezing.

References

Women's giant slalom